Love Can Lie is a 1937 German romance film directed by Heinz Helbig and starring Karl Ludwig Diehl, Dorothea Wieck and Jutta Freybe.

It was released by Tobis Film. The film's sets were designed by Erich Zander.

Cast
 Karl Ludwig Diehl as Ivar Andersson
 Dorothea Wieck as Sigrid Mallé
 Jutta Freybe as Kerstin Dahlberg
 Kurt Meisel as August Halfgreen
 Ingeborg von Kusserow as Britta Torsten
 Josefine Dora as Tante Betty
 Wilmo Schäfer as Emil
 Jeanette Bethge
 Marina von Ditmar
 Inga Ewald
 Erika Raphael
 Margo Kochan
 Gerhard Dammann
 Erich Dunskus
 Kurt Iller
 Curd Jürgens as Student Holger Engström
 Heinz Piper
 Otto Sauter-Sarto
 Inge Landgut
 Franz Arzdorf
 Margarete Faas
 Alfred Heynisch
 Berta Heynisch
 Antonie Jaeckel
 Kurt Keller-Nebri
 Karl Platen
 Irmingard Schreiter
 Toni Tetzlaff
 Hella Thornegg
 Helene Westphal
 Emmy Wyda

References

Bibliography

External links 
 

1937 films
Films of Nazi Germany
German romance films
1930s romance films
1930s German-language films
Films directed by Heinz Helbig
Tobis Film films
German black-and-white films
1930s German films